Jumbled is a 2019 Nigerian family romantic drama film directed by Saheed Apanpa. The film was primarily shot in Lagos. The film was initially titled as Entangled but it was changed in early 2019 to avoid the use of a similar title which was used by another filmmaker. It stars Wale Ojo, Femi Adebayo and Lilian Esoro in the lead roles. The film was released on 12 April 2019 and received mixed reviews from critics.

Synopsis 

A young girl in her early 30s who keeps her having her heart broken until she finds a suitable perfect ideal man for relationship, only to find out finally he may just be the worst of all other men.

Cast 

 Lilian Esoro as Adaeze
 Airebamen Irene
 Beverly Naya
 Femi Adebayo
 Wale Ojo

Release 
The cast and crew members were introduced to the media on 11 April 2019, a day prior to the film theatrical release at an exclusive screening of the film which was held at the Silverbird Cinema.

References

External links 
 

2019 romantic drama films
2019 films
English-language Nigerian films
Films shot in Nigeria
Nigerian romantic drama films
2010s English-language films